Mauricio Herrera Ulloa is a Costa Rican journalist and the current Costa Rican ambassador to Honduras. Herrera was previously the Minister of Communication under the presidency of Luis Guillermo Solís, the chief editor of the University of Costa Rica's newspaper Semanario Universidad, the Director of Communications at the Center for Justice and International Law, and the defendant of the landmark case  before the Inter-American Court of Human Rights.

Education

Herrera graduated with a bachelors' degree in Collective Communications from the University of Costa Rica in 1992 and a Master's degree in Political Sciences at the same university in 2006. He also earned a Master's degree in Journalism from the University of Barcelona in 2001 and was a Fellow at the Nieman Foundation for Journalism at Harvard University in 2007.

Herrera Ulloa vs. Costa Rica

In 1995, Herrera published a series of articles that addressed a corruption scandal surrounding Félix Przedborski, Costa Rica’s Ambassador to the International Atomic Energy Agency. Originally published by the Financieel-Economische Tijd, the articles published in La Nación reported on Przedborski's alleged involvement in political corruption schemes and other criminal activities. In response to the articles, Przedborski filed two criminal complaints and a civil lawsuit for defamation of a public official against Herrera and La Nación.

After being found innocent in May 1998, in 1999 the Supreme Court of Costa Rica reinstated the criminal defamation charges and ordered a re-trial; Herrera was later found guilty on four counts of criminal defamation. He was ordered to publish a section of the Court’s opinion in La Nación and to remove the links to the four articles in which Przedborski was mentioned by name. Herrera’s name was added to the Judiciary’s Record of Convicted Felons and he and La Nación were ordered to pay the plaintiff’s legal fees and US$200,000.00 in civil monetary damages to Przedborski. In 2001, the Supreme Court rejected an appeal by the applicants.

In March 2001, after a complaint was submitted to the Inter-American Commission of Human Rights, the Commission issued a report in October 2002 requesting Costa Rica to nullify the convictions against Herrera and La Nación. After the government of Costa Rica failed to comply with the measures within the given time-frame, the Commission submitted the case to the Inter-American Court of Human Rights.

In support of Herrera, an amicus curiae was submitted by the Open Society Justice Initiative.

Due to the violations to Herrera’s right to freedom of expression committed by the government of Costa Rica, the Inter-American Court ordered the following:

Project Finland and the Alcatel case

"El proyecto Finlandia" and "El caso Alcatel" were a series of reports published by Herrera, Giannina Segnini and Ernesto Rivera on illegal payments given by the Finnish medical company Instrumentarium Medko Medical and the French telecommunications company Alcatel to the former President of Costa Rica and former OAS Secretary-General Rafael Ángel Calderón, the former President of Costa Rica Miguel Ángel Rodríguez, and the former President of Costa Rica and former Managing Director and CEO of the World Economic Forum José María Figueres, among others.

As a result of both investigations, several high-profile individuals were fined and imprisoned and Alcatel was forced to pay $137 million in criminal fines in the U.S. and an added $10 million to the Costa Rican government as part settlement.

Instrumentarium Medko Medical has since been acquired by General Electric Healthcare

Awards

 1995 - Bartolomé Mitre Award, Inter American Press Association
 1999 - Henry Dunant Journalism Award (First Place), International Committee of the Red Cross, for his report Rehenes de la Guerra (Hostages of War)
 2005 - Ortega y Gasset Award, alongside his colleagues Ernesto Rivera and Giannina Segnini, for their reports El proyecto Finlandia and El caso Alcatel (Project Finland and The Alcatel Case) 
2005 - Best Investigative Journalism Report on Corruption in Latin America and the Caribbean, Transparency International
 2005 - Maria Moors Cabot Award (Special Citation), University of Columbia
 2014 - Premio a la defensa de la libertad de expresión José María Castro Madriz, Colegio de Periodistas de Costa Rica

References

1970 births
Costa Rican journalists
Male journalists
Investigative journalists
Living people
Nieman Fellows
University of Costa Rica alumni
Ambassadors of Costa Rica to Honduras